Väinö Tanner's cabinet was the 14th government of Finland, which existed from 13 December 1926 to 17 December 1927. It was a minority government led by Social Democratic Prime Minister Väinö Tanner. The cabinet's Deputy Minister of Social affairs, Miina Sillanpää, was the first female minister in Finnish history.

Ministers 

|}

References 

Tanner
1926 establishments in Finland
1927 disestablishments in Finland
Cabinets established in 1926
Cabinets disestablished in 1927